Wyandot Ridge is a rocky ridge at the west side of Chattahoochee Glacier. It extends northward from the northwest end of the Convoy Range. It was mapped by the United States Geological Survey (USGS) from ground surveys and Navy air photos. It was named in 1964 by the Advisory Committee on Antarctic Names (US-ACAN) after the USS Wyandot, a cargo vessel in the American convoy to McMurdo Sound in several years beginning with the 1955–56 season.

Ridges of Victoria Land
Scott Coast